26 Mixes for Cash is a compilation album of remixes produced by Richard D. James (under his recording alias Aphex Twin), mainly for other artists between 1990 and 2003. It was released on 24 March 2003 by Warp Records.

Background
Despite becoming a sought-after remixer during the 1990s, James admitted to not actually using the original source material in the case of some of his "remixes" for artists he disliked (such as Nine Inch Nails), explaining:  "I never heard the originals...I don't want to, either." In some cases, he submitted his own original work, or the work of his flatmate Global Goon in place of his own work.

Along with the 22 remixes on this release, four original Aphex Twin tracks are also included. Two are new versions of previously released tracks: "Windowlicker, Acid Edit" and "SAW2 CD1 TRK2, Original Mix". The other two were previously available only on Further Down the Spiral, the remix album by Nine Inch Nails: "The Beauty of Being Numb Section B" and an edited version of "At the Heart of It All".

In addition to the remixes featured on this release, James has also remixed tracks by Beck, DJ Pierre, and Soft Ballet, as well as additional remixes of tracks by Seefeel, Gavin Bryars, Jesus Jones, Saint Etienne, and Mescalinum United.

Release
26 Mixes for Cash was released on CD only, although a vinyl promotional disc entitled 2 Mixes on a 12" For Cash, featuring the two Aphex Twin originals exclusive to this compilation, was released in limited quantities in Japan only. Online orders of the compilation through Warp Records came with two silver-wrapped chocolate coins, featuring the Aphex Twin logo on one side and Richard's profile on the other (with "ELECTRONICA REX" written alongside it). The cover is by The Designers Republic.

James later clarified that the album was named 26 Mixes for Cash by the late Warp Records co-founder Rob Mitchell because James exchanged the remix DATs for cash in person so that the record companies would not know his bank account details or address.

Critical reception

AllMusic states that the compilation "comprises some of the most creative, breathtaking music produced by anyone in electronica". NME wrote that "the more cash at stake the less effort Aphex puts into honouring the spirit of the artist – an often hilarious greenie in the face of pop careerism". Pitchfork states that "frustrating gestation period aside, many of the tracks here are certified classics, and it's nice to have them all in one place".

Track listing

Charts

References

External links
26 Mixes for Cash at the Warp Records discography

Acid techno albums
Aphex Twin compilation albums
2003 remix albums
2003 compilation albums
Ambient techno compilation albums
Warp (record label) compilation albums
Warp (record label) remix albums
Albums with cover art by The Designers Republic